State Trunk Highway 60, often called Highway 60, STH-60 or WIS 60, is a state highway in the U.S. state of Wisconsin. It runs east–west in southern Wisconsin from Prairie du Chien on the Mississippi River at the Iowa state line to the village of Grafton near Lake Michigan.

Route description

Iowa state line to Sauk Prairie
WIS 60 begins at the Marquette–Joliet Bridge above the Mississippi River. Since US Highway 18 (US 18) and WIS 60 share the same bridge, both routes form a concurrency. At the eastern approach, the concurrency briefly becomes a one-way pair before turning south. For eastbound traffic, they utilize Iowa Street; for westbound traffic, they utilize Wisconsin Street. Before turning south on Main Street, they intersect WIS 27. After traveling south, they then briefly curve east just north of the Prairie du Chien Municipal Airport. Then, they travel southeastward via WIS 35 and the Great River Road. In Bridgeport, WIS 60 leaves the concurrency, continuing eastward.

At this point, WIS 60 closely parallels the north side of the Wisconsin River. It then passes through Wauzeka, intersects WIS 131, passes through Boydtown, and then Easter Rock. After leaving US 61, it passes through Westport, Sand Prairie, and Port Andrew. It then intersects WIS 193 south of Balmoral and WIS 80 north of Muscoda. Starting at Gotham, WIS 60 begins to run concurrently with US 14. WIS 130 then leaves the concurrency and then joins WIS 133. Near Spring Green, WIS 23 briefly joins the concurrency. After that, WIS 60 branches off eastward while the others are going south/southeastward. WIS 60 continues to meander north of the Wisconsin River. West of Sauk City, WIS 60 runs concurrently with US 12 all the way towards downtown. In downtown Sauk City, WIS 60 turns northward along the west side of the river. As a result, it leaves US 12 while joins WIS 78. In Prairie du Sac, WIS 60 turns east, leaving WIS 78, and then crossing over the Wisconsin River.

Sauk Prairie to Grafton
After crossing the Wisconsin River, WIS 60 then meets WIS 188. After WIS 188 leaves WIS 60, WIS 60 continues eastward. This time, WIS 60 no longer parallels the Wisconsin River. In Lodi, it intersects WIS 113. In the middle of Lodi and Arlington, it meets I-39/I-90/I-94 at a parclo. Between Arlington and Leeds, it runs concurrently with US 51. Shortly after leaving US 51, it then meets WIS 22. In Columbus, WIS 60 begins to run concurrently with WIS 16. They then meet US 151 at a diamond interchange and then intersect WIS 73. Continuing east past Columbus, they then pass through Astico and Lowell. They then meet WIS 26 at a diamond interchange. At this point, WIS 16 turns south to get onto WIS 26.

WIS 60 then passes through Hustisford, then intersects WIS 67 north of Neosho and WIS 83 in Hartford. In Slinger, it then intersects WIS 175 and then WIS 164. Then, it meets I-41/US 41 at a five-ramp parclo. It then meets US 45 at a diamond interchange in Jackson. Just northwest of Cedarburg, it intersects WIS 181. After passing through downtown Grafton, it then meets I-43/WIS 32/WIS 57 at a diamond interchange. At this point, WIS 60 ends there and continues on as  County Trunk Highway Q (CTH-Q).

Major intersections

See also

References

External links

060
Transportation in Crawford County, Wisconsin
Transportation in Richland County, Wisconsin
Transportation in Sauk County, Wisconsin
Transportation in Columbia County, Wisconsin
Transportation in Dodge County, Wisconsin
Transportation in Washington County, Wisconsin
Transportation in Ozaukee County, Wisconsin